The Abilene Blue Sox were a minor league baseball team that operated in the West Texas–New Mexico League from 1946 to 1955 and the Big State League from 1956 to 1957. They were an affiliate of the Brooklyn Dodgers (1946–48) and the Kansas City Athletics (1956–57). The nickname came from the blue trim hose used by their Brooklyn parent team. The 1946 Abilene Blue Sox are considered one of the top 100 Minor League Baseball teams of all-time. Among the players who played for them was Al Silvera.

References

External links
 Welcome Page – Website about the team
 The Official Site of Minor League Baseball – Top 100 Minor League Teams

Defunct baseball teams in Texas
Brooklyn Dodgers minor league affiliates
Kansas City Athletics minor league affiliates
Baseball teams established in 1946
Baseball teams disestablished in 1957
Baseball teams in Abilene, Texas
1946 establishments in Texas
1957 disestablishments in Texas
Defunct Big State League teams